Euridice Axen (born 20 September 1980) is an Italian actress.

Early life 
Euridica is the daughter of the Swedish actress Eva Axén and of the Italian actor, director and dubber Adalberto Maria Merli, Euridice bears her maternal surname by mutual agreement of her parents.

Filmography

Cinema

TV
 Vivere (1999) - Valeria Castri
 CentoVetrine (2001) - Monica Graziosi (2005-2006)
 Carabinieri (2008, Episode: 7x22) - Marzia Cherubini
 Medicina generale (2009–2010) - Letizia Conti
 R.I.S. Roma – Delitti imperfetti (2010–2012) - Capitano Lucia Brancato
 Cugino & cugino (2011) - Monica Fontana
 L'ispettore Coliandro (2016, Episode: 5x06) - Anna
 The Young Pope (2016, Episode: 1x04)
 Il processo (2019) - Mara Raimondi
 40 & Climbing (2021, TV movie) - Isabella
 Carla (2021, TV movie) - Esmée Bulnes
 An Astrological Guide for Broken Hearts (2021) - Barbara Buchneim

References

External links
 

1980 births
Living people
Actresses from Rome
Italian film actresses
Italian television actresses
21st-century Italian actresses
Italian people of Swedish descent